Jonathan McMillan Davis  (April 27, 1871 – June 27, 1943) was an American politician and the 22nd Governor of Kansas.

Biography
Davis was born in Bronson, Kansas, to Jonathan McMillan and Eve (Holeman) Davis.  His education was in the public schools and the University of Kansas and the University of Nebraska–Lincoln. He left college without graduating due to the death of his father. He married Mary "Mollie" Purdom on September 26, 1894, and they had four children. Mollie died in 1926 and he married Mary E. (Winston) Raymond on December 16, 1931.

Career
Davis served in the Kansas House of Representatives from 1905 to 1913; and then in the Kansas State Senate from 1915 to 1917.

Davis won a narrow victory over Republican William Yoast Morgan in the 1922 Kansas gubernatorial election and was sworn into office on January 8, 1923. During his tenure, taxes were cut, prohibition and women's suffrage were endorsed, increased funding secured for veteran's pensions, banking procedures were limited, an improved road bill was authorized, utilities were controlled, and the chancellor of the University of Kansas was fired.

Davis was the Democratic candidate in the 1924 Kansas gubernatorial election but the independent candidacy of publisher William Allen White on an anti-Ku Klux Klan platform split the progressive vote and Republican Benjamin S. Paulen was elected by a plurality.

Davis was arrested the day after his term ended. He was indicted twice for bribery, tried twice and acquitted both times. His defense was led by Populist lawyers Alexander Miller Harvey and Frank Doster.

He was again the Democratic nominee in the 1926 Kansas gubernatorial election but lost in a landslide to the incumbent Paulen. In 1930 Davis was the Democratic nominee for US Senate opposing incumbent Republican Arthur Capper and suffered another landslide loss.

In 1936 Davis made another run for governor but lost the Democratic primary to Walter A. Huxman. He ran for governor as an independent in 1938 but received less than 2% of the vote.

Death
Davis died on June 27, 1943, following a lengthy illness and several repeat visits to a Fort Scott hospital. He is interred at Bronson Cemetery in Bronson, Kansas.

References

External links
 
The Political Graveyard
National Governors Association
Publications concerning Kansas Governor Davis' administration available via the KGI Online Library

Democratic Party governors of Kansas
Democratic Party members of the Kansas House of Representatives
Democratic Party Kansas state senators
1871 births
1943 deaths
People from Bourbon County, Kansas
Methodists from Kansas